Trofosfamide (INN) is a nitrogen mustard alkylating agent. It is sometimes abbreviated "TRO". It has been used in trials to study its effects on ependymoma, medulloblastoma, sarcoma, soft tissue, supratentorial PNET, and recurrent brain tumors.

References

Organochlorides
Oxazaphosphinans
Phosphorodiamidates
Nitrogen mustards
Chloroethyl compounds